Prijezda I ((1211–1287) was a Bosnian Ban as a vassal of the Hungarian Kingdom, reigning 1250–1287. He was probably the founder of the House of Kotromanić.

Biography

From Christianity to Heresy and back 
Prijezda was originally a Roman Catholic Christian, but he converted to Bogomilism later on. According to the Pope's letter to Ban Matej Ninoslav, he converted back to Catholicism during Matej's reign. As he could not be trusted because of his previous conversion, he was forced to send his son as a guarantee to the Dominican Order. Ban Matej Ninoslav had to beg even to Rome itself for the release of Prijezda's son, Prijezda II, guaranteeing that they are none other than faithful Catholics – but the pleas reached deaf ears.

Reign during the Crusade 
During the Bosnian Crusade (1234–1239) against Matej Ninoslav Herzeg Coloman commanding the Christian Armies conquered most of Bosnia and temporarily pushed Matej and his forces. He gave the title of Bosnian Ban to Prijezda, who was Ninoslav's closest living relative. Prijezda ruled for only two years, because Matej managed to restore control over most of Bosnia after the Hungarian defeat in the face of the Mongols. As Prijezda was in mortal danger, he fled to Hungary.

Ban 
After the death of Matej Ninoslav in 1250, the question of power over Bosnia was initiated. Ninoslav's sons fought valiantly to keep Bosnia independent, but eventually King Béla IV of Hungary martially subjected Bosnia and made Prijezda its Ban, who vouched to rule in Hungary's name.

After he became Ban, Prijezda started a campaign to exterminate the Bosnian Church's heresy in Bosnia. Due to his ruthless fight against the Bogumils, the Pope ordered the Dominicans to return him his son as it appeared that Prijezda became a pious Catholic. On 11 November 1253 Hungarian King Bela wrote how he fiercely fought against the Bosnian heretics with his armies. After that, King Bela partitioned the Bosnian banate in a way that Prijezda was given Bosnia proper, the area between the valleys of the rivers of Vrbas and Bosna, as his hereditary demesne.

Usora and Soli on the other hand were made separate banates ruled by Bans named by the King – Rostislav, Béla, Michael – later subjected to the Banate of Macsó, which had been raised to a Dukedom. Eventually, Bosnia itself was subjected to the Duchy of Macsó.

Because of his heroic fights, Prijezda received the title "Fidelis Noster" ("Our Faithful") from the Hungarian King, as well as several lands outside Bosnia, around Gornji Miholjac. King Bela IV of Hungary attacked the Serb Kingdom of Rascia of King Stefan Uroš I and conquered Zahumlje in 1254 which it gave to Prijezda's Bosnia, but the eventual peace between Hungary and the Serbs returned it to Rascia. In 1255 the Hungarian King granted new lands to the Bosnian Ban in Slavonia. Prijezda had to dispatch Bosnian forces in 1260 to fight in the Hungarian Army against the Bohemian King.

In 1270, King Bela IV died. He was succeeded by his son Stephen V. The powerful Duke of Macsó was killed a war in 1272. The same year King Stephen V died. The Hungarian throne was succeeded by his son Ladislaus IV. He was too young to rule, so his Cuman mother Elizabeth acted as regent. During these changing times for the power in Hungary Prijezda's power dropped severely. Not only did several Hungarian nobles, including Ugrin of Severin, Hungary's treasure-holder included Bosnia in their titles, but a certain Bosnian nobleman Stephen appeared in Bosnia with high influence and prestige; greatly surpassing that of Prijezda.

In 1284, Prijezda arranged a marriage between the Serbian Princess Jelisaveta, daughter of the King of Syrmia, Stefan Dragutin, and his son Stephen I Kotromanić in an attempt to forge an ever-lasting alliance with Dragutin.

Prijezda was forced to withdraw from the throne in 1287 due to his old age. He spent his last hours on his estate in Zemljenik.

Children 
Prijezda had four children:
Stephen I Kotromanić – it is not known precisely if he was his son
Prijezda II
Vuk (died 1287)
a daughter that married Stephen Vodički of the Croatian Babonić family

See also 
 House of Kotromanić
 History of Bosnia and Herzegovina
 History of Hungary
 List of Bosnian rulers
 List of Bosnians

Sources 
 Veselinović, Andrija & Ljušić, Radoš (2001). Српске династије, Platoneum.
 Ćorović, Vladimir (2005). ИЛУСТРОВАНА ИСТОРИЈА СРБА, Book II, Politika.
 Intervju – ДИНАСТИЈЕ и владари јужнословенских народа. Special Edition 12, 16 June 1989.

External links
 History of the Serbs, by Vladimir Ćorović 

Bans of Bosnia
1211 births
1287 deaths
Kotromanić dynasty
13th-century Hungarian people
13th-century Bosnian people
Bosnia and Herzegovina Roman Catholics
People of the Banate of Bosnia